Tim Denny Björkström (born 8 January 1991) is a Swedish footballer who currently plays for Fredrikstad as a defender.

Career
Björkström started out playing youth football for Hanvikens SK before moving to IF Brommapojkarna when he was twelve. During his teens he trialed with foreign teams like Liverpool F.C. but ended up staying in Sweden. Brommapojkarna had a cooperation with third tier Stockholm club Gröndals IK at the time where Björkström was one of many players to go on loan to gain first team football experience.

In 2009, he made his first team debut in Allsvenskan and became a starter for the club at right back throughout the following years until he left as a free agent at the end of 2014 to sign a three-year deal with Djurgårdens IF.

In January 2023, Björkström joined Norwegian First Division club Fredrikstad.

International career
Björkström has represented Sweden at the U17, U19 and U21 youth levels.

Personal life
Outside of his football career Björkström also owns and runs a car restoration company. The night before each game he has a ritual where he eats candy, potato chips and drinks soda.

References

External links

1991 births
Living people
Association football defenders
IF Brommapojkarna players
Swedish footballers
Djurgårdens IF Fotboll players
Gröndals IK players
Östersunds FK players
IK Sirius Fotboll players
Fredrikstad FK players
Allsvenskan players
Sweden under-21 international footballers
Sweden youth international footballers
Swedish expatriate footballers
Expatriate footballers in Norway
Swedish expatriate sportspeople in Norway